Louis Asher, originally Julius Ludwig Asher,  (1804–1878) was a German artist.

Life
Asher was born at Hamburg on  26 June 1804. He studied there under Gerdt Hardorf and Leo Lehmann, and in 1821 went for further instruction to Dresden, and from there to Düsseldorf, where he entered the studio of Cornelius. There he got to know Kaulbach, with whom he continued a friendship throughout his life. In 1825 he accompanied Cornelius to Munich, where he was employed by him on the frescoes of the Glyptothek. He is associated with the Düsseldorf school of painting.

In 1827 he returned to Hamburg, and then, in 1832, went via Berlin to Italy, where he remained for three years. On his return to Germany, with the exception of a second visit to Italy in 1839 in the company of Kaulbach, he lived  in Munich and in Hamburg, where he died on 7 March 1878.

Works
Asher's works, which consist of historical pictures, genre paintings, and portraits, include:
Peasant Family (1835).
Resurrection of Christ (1851).
King Lear with the dead body of Cordelia (1854).
St. Cecilia.
Maria I'Ortolana.
Portrait of Mlle. Jenny Lind.

See also
 List of German painters

References

External links

Attribution:
 

1804 births
1878 deaths
Artists from Hamburg
19th-century German painters
19th-century German male artists
German male painters
Düsseldorf school of painting